Holmes County School District is a name shared by several school districts in the United States

 Holmes County School District (Florida) (see List of school districts in Florida#H)
 Holmes County School District (Mississippi)